Noviomagus is the name of a number of settlements found across the Western Roman Empire. The name is a Latinisation of Common Celtic placename elements Novio meaning "New" and -magos meaning "Field" or "Market".

Noviomagus may refer to:

Places

France
 Noviomagus Lexoviorum ("Noviomagus of the Lexovii"), the Gallo-Roman settlement at Lisieux, France
 Noviomagus Veromanduorum ("Noviomagus of the Veromandui"), the Gallo-Roman settlement at Noyon, France
 Noviomagus Tricastinorum ("Noviomagus of the Tricastini"), later known as "Augusta" and "Colonia Flavia Tricastinorum", the Gallo-Roman settlement at Saint-Paul-Trois-Châteaux, France

Germany
 Noviomagus Nemetum ("Noviomagus of the Nemetes"), the Germano-Roman settlement at Speyer, Germany
 Noviomagus Trevirorum ("Noviomagus of the Trevii"), the Germano-Roman settlement at Neumagen-Dhron near Trier, Germany

Great Britain
 Noviomagus Reginorum ("Noviomagus of the Regnenses"), the Romano-British settlement at Chichester, West Sussex, in England
 Noviomagus Cantiacorum ("Noviomagus of the Kentish"), the Romano-British settlement probably located at West Wickham, near London, England
 Noviomagus, the previous site mistakenly placed by John Dunkin near Dartford, England, usually quoted as Crayford

The Netherlands
 Ulpia Noviomagus Batavorum ("Ulpian Noviomagus of the Batavians"), the Germano-Roman settlement at Nijmegen in the Netherlands

People
 Daniel Santbech Noviomagus, Dutch mathematician and astronomer (died circa 1561) has given his name to the Santbech crater on the Moon

See also
 Noviomagum, a minor planet
 Neumagen, a river in the Black Forest
 Nijmegen, a city in The Netherlands